The 1858 New South Wales colonial election was to return 54 members of Legislative Assembly composed of 34 electoral districts with 18 returning 1 member, 13 returning 2 members, two returning 3 members and one returning 4 members,  all with a first past the post system. In multi-member districts, because each voter could cast more than one vote, it is not possible to total the votes to show the number of voters and voter turnout in these districts is estimated. 17 members from 14 districts were returned unopposed. The electoral districts and boundaries were established under the Electoral Act 1851 (NSW) for the former Legislative Council.

Results by district

Argyle

Bathurst (County)

Clarence and Darling Downs

The sitting member Clark Irving unsuccessfully contested Northumberland and Hunter.

Cook and Westmoreland

Cumberland Boroughs

William Dalley had been defeated as a sitting member for Sydney City.

Cumberland (North Riding)

The sitting member James Pye unsuccessfully contested Parramatta.

Cumberland (South Riding)

The other sitting member James Byrnes successfully contested Parramatta. Edward Flood was a sitting member for North Eastern Boroughs. Thomas Holt was the sitting member for Stanley Boroughs. There was some debate as to whether George Smith had received no votes, with Stuart Donaldson stating that he had seen one vote while Edward Flood said he had seen several.

Durham

Eastern Division of Camden

Gloucester and Macquarie

King and Georgiana

Lachlan and Lower Darling

The sitting member James Garland did not contest the election. The show of hands was in favour of William Macleay and John Paterson and while the supporters of Edward Flood and John Egan called for a poll, they did not have the six electors that were required. Edward Flood successfully contested Cumberland (South Riding).

Liverpool Plains and Gwydir

The sitting members Gideon Lang and Francis Rusden did not contest the election.

Maneroo

Moreton, Wide Bay, Burnett, Maranoa, Leichhardt and Port Curtis

The sitting member Patrick Leslie did not contest the election. The returning officer stated that the lack of a mail service to northern parts of the district, being Gladstone, Rannes and Surat meant that no polling had occurred in those places. The Legislative Assembly directed him to return the writ. William Tooth was subsequently proclaimed to have been elected, and Tooth was sworn in on 22 June 1858.

Murrumbidgee

New England and Macleay

The former member Thomas Rusden unsuccessfully petitioned against the election of Moriaty.

North Eastern Boroughs

The sitting member Edward Flood successfully contested Cumberland (South Riding).

Northumberland and Hunter

The other sitting member Hovenden Hely did not contest the election. Clark Irving was the member for Clarence and Darling Downs.

Northumberland Boroughs

Parramatta

The other sitting member Henry Parker did not contest the election. James Byrnes was the member for Cumberland (South Riding). James Pye petitioned against the election alleging his supporters had been intimidated from voting, however this was dismissed as unproven.

Phillip, Brisbane and Bligh

Roxburgh

St Vincent

The sitting member James Thompson did not contest the election.

Southern Boroughs

Stanley Boroughs

The sitting member Thomas Holt unsuccessfully contested Cumberland (South Riding).

Stanley County

Sydney City

Robert Tooth had unsuccessfully contested Sydney Hamlets.

Sydney Hamlets

United Counties of Murray and St Vincent

Wellington and Bligh

Wellington (County)

Western Boroughs

Western Division of Camden

See also
 Members of the New South Wales Legislative Assembly, 1858–1859
 Candidates of the 1858 New South Wales colonial election

Notes

References

1858